João Pedro Barreira Carneiro (born 21 February 1987) is a Portuguese football player who plays for São Martinho.

Club career
He made his professional debut in the Segunda Liga for Académico de Viseu on 9 August 2014 in a game against Chaves.

References

1987 births
Living people
Sportspeople from Guimarães
Portuguese footballers
F.C. Famalicão players
G.D. Joane players
AD Fafe players
Académico de Viseu F.C. players
Liga Portugal 2 players
Varzim S.C. players
Amarante F.C. players
Vilaverdense F.C. players
A.R. São Martinho players
Association football defenders